Besaw's is restaurant serving American cuisine in Portland, Oregon's Northwest District, in the United States.

History
The restaurant closed in May 2015, following a trademark disagreement and lease dispute. Besaw's reopened at NW 23rd and Savier in January 2016.

Cana Flug owns Besaw's. The restaurant closed temporarily in 2020, during the COVID-19 pandemic.

Reception
In 2019, Alex France included Besaw's in Eater Portland list of "16 Quintessential Restaurants and Bars in Slabtown".

References

External links

 
 

Northwest District, Portland, Oregon
Restaurants in Portland, Oregon
Year of establishment missing